Alhaji Umar Namadi  (born April 7, 1963) is a Nigerian politician and a chartered accountant who serves as the deputy governor of Jigawa State in Nigeria. He was born in Jigawa, Nigeria.

Background 
Alhaji Namadi was born was born in April 1963 in Kafin Hausa town of Kafin Hausa Local Government became a qualified as a chartered accountant in 1993 and holds a Masters in Business Administration (MBA) of Bayero University, Kano where he earlier obtained his first Degree of Bachelor of Science in Accountancy in 1987

Career 
Alhaji Namadi is the founder of Namadi, Umar & Co Chartered Accountants firm based in Kano was from 1993 an Associate member of the Nigeria Institute of Management, Institute of Chartered Accountants of Nigeria, Chartered Institute of Taxation until 2010 when he became a fellow of the Institute of Chartered Accountants of Nigeria. Alhaji Namadi was also engaged in research works, on Sources and Application of Funds, Auditing a Computerized Information System and Community Banking. As the pioneer Head of Dangote Group Management Accounts Department, the finance expert was responsible for the establishment and foundation laying for the production of monthly management accounts for Dangote Group. Until his appointment, the commissioner was a member of the state committee on verification and validation of contracts as well as that of verification and staff audit

See also  
Jigawa State past and present Deputy Governors (List)

References

1964 births
Living people
Nigerian politicians